Fumiko Hayashi may refer to:

, Japanese novelist and poet
, Japanese politician